Skirt steak is a cut of beef steak from the plate. It is not to be confused with hanger steak, a generally similar adjacent cut also from the plate.

Though it is from a different part of the animal, its general characteristics and uses cause it to be confused with both flank steak, taken from the flank behind the plate, and the flap meat from the bottom sirloin behind the flank and above the rear quarter.

Characteristics
Both the inside and outside skirt steak are the trimmed, boneless portion of the diaphragm muscle attached to the 6th through 12th ribs on the underside of the short plate. This steak is covered in a tough membrane that may be removed before cooking. By keeping the membrane it will be more tender but would require the eater to remove it which is why many remove it prior to cooking. 

The inside skirt steak is often confused with the flank steak, which is the tail of the porter house and T-bone steaks of the short loin found on the flank, and hanger steak. It has similar cooking properties.

In the United States, the North American Meat Processors Association (NAMP) classifies all skirts steaks NAMP 121. NAMP 121 is further subdivided into the outer (outside) skirt steak (NAMP 121C) and the inner (inside) skirt steak (NAMP 121D). The beef flank steak (NAMP 193) is adjacent to the skirt, nearer the animal's rear quarter.

History
The name "skirt steak" for the butcher's cut of beef diaphragm has been in use since at least the 19th century. The cut is defined as extending to the 10th rib in the early 20th century. It was formerly considered a less commercially mass-salable cut in America, hence its use for fajitas by the vaqueros in Texas.

The U.S. Food Safety and Quality Service established in 1977 (now the Food Safety and Inspection Service) by the Department of Agriculture (USDA) had designated the cut as "beef skirt diaphragm" (with the adjoining cut being called "hanging tender diaphragm"). But the diaphragms were treated as "offal" rather than meat by the Japanese government, thus exempt from any beef import quota restrictions. These cuts of U. S. beef (and Canadian beef) could consequently be exported to Japan without quota restrictions, and constituted a major portion of the U.S. beef trades there from ca. 1975 into the 1980s, until the beef import deregulation in Japan lifted the quotas in 1991.

Uses
It is also the cut of choice for making fajitas, churrasco, and in Cornish pasties.

Preparation
To minimize toughness and add flavor, skirt steaks are often marinated before grilling, pan-seared or grilled very quickly, or cooked very slowly, typically braised. They are typically sliced against the grain before serving to maximize tenderness.

See also
 Flank steak
 Flap steak
 Hanger steak
 List of steak dishes

References

Bibliography

External links
 

Cuts of beef